George F. Mobley (born February 4, 1935) is an American photographer. His work has been published in National Geographic Magazine and elsewhere.

References 

American photographers
Living people
1935 births